Dwayne Foster is a former American football player and coach. He served as the interim head football coach at North Carolina Central University for one season, in 2013, compiling a record of 5–7. Foster was the assistant head, coach, recruiting coordinator, and offensive line coach at North Carolina Central from 2011 to 2012.

Head coaching record

College

References

Year of birth missing (living people)
Living people
Bowie State Bulldogs football coaches
Catholic University Cardinals football coaches
Delaware State Hornets football players
Morgan State Bears football coaches
North Carolina Central Eagles football coaches
Prairie View A&M Panthers football coaches
High school football coaches in Washington, D.C.
African-American coaches of American football
African-American players of American football
21st-century African-American people